Roccafranca is a comune in the province of Brescia, in Lombardy, northern Italy. It is located on the left bank of the Oglio River, in the Po Plain.

References

Cities and towns in Lombardy